Gary M. Hieftje is an analytical chemist, Distinguished Professor, and the Robert & Marjorie Mann Chair of Chemistry at Indiana University in Bloomington, Indiana. Gary M. Hieftje received his A.B. degree at Hope College in Holland, Michigan in 1964, and his PhD from University of Illinois at Urbana–Champaign in 1969. In 1969, he started his career in teaching and research at Indiana University. Hieftje was named a Distinguished Professor in 1985, and entered emeritus status in 2018. As of 2018, Dr. Hieftje has been involved in over 600 publications.

Research in the Hieftje Group mainly focuses on studying and improving the mechanisms and methods of atomic emission and absorption, fluorescence, and mass spectrometry. He also works to develop new methods of analysis for atoms, molecules, and biomolecules. His group even developed an online computer program to control their experiments. Some areas of interest to his research are: finding new applications of lasers, linear response theory, near-infrared correlation methods of analysis, time-resolved luminescence, and fiber-optic sensors.

Professor Hieftje has authored many books. Perhaps, the most well-known is “Chemical Separations and Measurements - The Theory and Practice of Analytical Chemistry” with colleagues Dennis G. Peters and John M. Hayes published by Saunders in Philadelphia in 1974.

Awards and honors
1979 Can Test Award by the Chemical Institute of Canada
1983 Science & Engineering Research Council Senior Fellowship
1983 Co-recipient of an IR-100 Award
1984 Meggers Award by the Society for Applied Spectroscopy
1984 Lester W. Strock Award by the Society for Applied Spectroscopy 
1984 Anachem Award
1985 Chemical Instrumentation Award by the American Chemical Society
1986 Pittsburgh Analytical Chemistry Award from the Royal Society of Chemistry
1986 Theophilus Redwood Award from the Royal Society of Chemistry
1987 American Chemical Society Award in Analytical Chemistry
1987 Tracy M. Sonneborn Teacher-Scholar Award from Indiana University
1987 Elected to Fellowship in the American Association for the Advancement of Science
1988 R&D 100 Award by Research & Development Magazine
1989 ACS Award in Spectrochemical Analysis from the Analytical Chemistry Division of the American Chemical Society
1989 Indiana Academy of Science, Fellow
1991 Received the Gold Medal of the Quality Control Academy of the Upjohn Company
1991 Pergamon/Spectrochimica Acta Atomic Spectroscopy Award
1992 Eastern Analytical Symposium Award for Outstanding Achievements in the Fields of Analytical Chemistry
1992 Awarded a second Lester W. Strock Award
1993 Distinguished Faculty Award from the College of Arts and Sciences alumni of Indiana University
1993 Golden Key National Honor Society, Honorary Member
1995 Honorary Professor of Jilin University, Jilin, China
1996 Humboldt Research Award for Senior U.S. Scientists
1996 Meggers Award from the Society for Applied Spectroscopy
1998 ACS-Analytical Division Award for Excellence in Teaching
1999 Awarded Honorary Membership in the Society for Applied Spectroscopy
1999-00 Director of the Linda and Jack Gill Center for Instrumentation and Measurement Science at Indiana University
2000 Appointed to the Robert and Marjorie Mann Chair of Chemistry
2000-01 Indiana Academy of Science Speaker of the Year
2001 Pittsburgh Spectroscopy Award
2002 Trustees Teaching Award at Indiana University
2004 New York Section of the Society for Applied Spectroscopy Gold Medal Award
2004 Monie A. Ferst Award (Sigma Xi)
2004 Society for Applied Spectroscopy, Fellow
2005 Royal Society of Chemistry, Fellow
2007 CSI XXXV Award, sponsored by Wiley
2009 Maurice Hasler Award
2010 USP Award for an Outstanding Contribution to the Standard-Setting Process
2010 Robert Boyle Prize for Analytical Science
2011 American Chemical Society (ACS) Fellow
2011 R&D 100 Award by Research and Development Magazine
2012 Distinguished Service Award by the American Chemical Society-Analytical Division
2012 Ralph and Helen Oesper Award by the University of Cincinnati
2020 Bicentennial Medal

References

Year of birth missing (living people)
Living people
Analytical chemists
People from Bloomington, Indiana
Hope College alumni
Indiana University Bloomington faculty
University of Illinois Urbana-Champaign alumni